Swiss Americans are Americans of Swiss descent.

Swiss emigration to America predates the formation of the United States, notably in connection with the persecution of Anabaptism during the Swiss Reformation and the formation of the Amish community.
In the 19th century, there was substantial immigration of Swiss farmers, who preferred rural settlements in the Midwest.
Swiss immigration diminished after 1930, although limited immigration continues.
The number of Americans of Swiss descent is nearly one million. The Swiss Federal Department of Foreign Affairs reported the permanent residency of Swiss nationals in the United States as 80,218 in 2015. According to the U.S. Census Bureau, 26,896 individuals born in Switzerland declared that they were of Swiss ancestry in 2015, 3,047 individuals born in Switzerland declared that they were of German ancestry in 2015, 1,255 individuals born in Switzerland declared that they were of French ancestry in 2015, and 2,555 individuals born in Switzerland declared that they were of Italian ancestry in 2015.

History

The first Swiss person in what is now the territory of the United States was Theobald (Diebold) von Erlach (1541–1565).
The history of the Amish church began with a schism in Switzerland within a group of Swiss and Alsatian Anabaptists in 1693 led by Jakob Ammann, a native of Erlenbach im Simmental.

During the late 18th and early 19th centuries, a flow of Swiss farmers formed colonies, particularly in Russia and the United States.

Before the year 1820 some estimated 25,000 to 30,000 Swiss entered British North America. Most of them settled in regions of today's Pennsylvania as well as North and South Carolina. In the next years until 1860 about as many Swiss arrived, making their homes mainly in the Midwestern states such as Ohio, Indiana, Illinois and Wisconsin. Approximately 50,000 came between 1860 and 1880, some 82,000 between 1881 and 1890, and estimated 90,000 more during the next three decades.

In spite of Swiss settlements like Highland (Illinois), New Glarus (Wisconsin), New Bern (North Carolina), Gruetli (Tennessee) and Bernstadt (Kentucky) were emerging fast, most Swiss preferred rural villages of the Midwest and the Pacific Coast where especially the Italian Swiss were taking part in California's winegrowing culture, or then took up residence in more industrial and urban regions such as New York City, Philadelphia, Pittsburgh, Chicago, St. Louis, Denver or San Francisco. As the lifestyle and political institutions of the United States were compliant with those of their homeland most Swiss had no problems starting a new life in their part of the New World and became attached to both countries.

Along with the Swiss Immigrants came their traditions. By the late 1800s sufficient numbers of Swiss had arrived that Swiss Vereins (Clubs) were established to provide camaraderie and sharing of customs and traditions of the Heimat (Homeland). The William Tell Verein of Oakland and the Helvetia Verein of Sacramento, founded in the 1890s, were examples of clubs formed during this period. Much later, the West Coast Swiss Wrestling Association was established to preserve the Swiss tradition of Schwingen (Swiss wrestling) on the Pacific coast of the United States.

Of Swiss immigrant involvement in the Civil War, David Vogelsanger writes, "More Swiss participated in the American Civil War than in any other foreign conflict except the Battle of Marignano in 1515 and Napoleon's Russian Campaign of 1812."

Swiss immigration diminished after 1930 because of the depression and World War II, but 23,700 more Swiss had arrived by 1960, followed by 29,100 more between 1961 and 1990, many of whom were professionals or employees in American branches of Swiss companies who later returned to Switzerland.

Population

Swiss Americans by numbers

Swiss Americans by percentage of total population

Communities settled by Swiss immigrants

Swiss American historical societies
Beech Island Historical Society, a historical society in South Carolina dedicated to the preservation of Historic Beech Island, including the early Swiss settlement led by John Tobler.
Grundy County Swiss Historical Society, a historical society in Grundy County, Tennessee, site of former Swiss colony of Gruetli.
Highland Historical Society, a historical society centered in Highland, Illinois, site of one of the oldest Swiss settlements in the United States.  It was founded in 1831 by Swiss pioneers from Sursee, Switzerland.
Orangeburgh German-Swiss Genealogical Society, a genealogical society focused on the early Swiss and German settlers of Orangeburg, South Carolina.
Santa Clara Utah Historical Society, a historical Society dedicated to the preservation of an early Swiss Settlement in Utah.
Swiss American Historical Society – focuses on the involvement of the Swiss and their descendants in American life, aspects of Swiss American relations, and Swiss history.
Swiss Heritage Village & Museum – begun in 1985, it is currently the largest outdoor museum in northern Indiana. It is located in Berne, Indiana.
Swiss Mennonite Cultural and Historical Association – consists of descendants of the Mennonites who immigrated to the U.S. from Ukraine in the 1870s.
The Swiss Center of North America includes an extensive list of Swiss clubs.
The Descendants of Swiss Settlers, founded in 2019, honors the legacy and achievements of Swiss men and women who settled in North America prior to March 5, 1798, which marks the end of the Old Swiss Confederacy.

Notable people

See also

 Switzerland–United States relations
 Swiss people
 Swiss abroad
 Swiss Argentines
 Swiss Brazilians
 Swiss Canadians
 Swiss Chileans
 Swiss Mexicans
 European Americans
 Swiss American Historical Society

References

Further reading
 Pochmann, Henry A. German Culture in America: Philosophical and Literary Influences 1600–1900 (1957). 890pp; comprehensive review of German influence on Americans esp 19th century. online
 Pochmann, Henry A. and  Arthur R. Schult.  Bibliography of German Culture in America to 1940 (2nd ed 1982); massive listing, but no annotations. 

 Schelbert, Leo. "Swiss Americans." Gale Encyclopedia of Multicultural America, edited by Thomas Riggs, (3rd ed., vol. 4, Gale, 2014), pp. 319–329. Online
 Schelbert, Leo, ed. American Letters: Eighteenth and Nineteenth Century Accounts of Swiss Immigrants (Camden, ME: Picton Press, 1995).
 Tritt, D. G., ed. Swiss Festivals in North America: A Resource Guide (Masthof Press, 1999).

External links
Swiss Americans
Swiss American Historical Society
OltreconfiniTi, the official website dedicated to Ticinese emigration
San Joaquin Valley Swiss Club (California, USA)

Articles about the Swiss in the United States
 Hacken, Richard (2020). "A History of the Swiss in California," Swiss American Historical Society Review, vol.56 (2020), no. 1, pp. 115–162.
 The  History of New Schwanden Swiss community  Hennepin County, Minnesota is the story of a former Swiss colony in Minnesota written by Wayne C. Blesi.
 
  Swiss Americans Article by University of Illinois – Chicago emeritus professor Dr. Leo Schelbert about Swiss Americans.
  Settling Berne Article by Harold Miller about Berne, NY.

Research links
 Keith Zollinger Collection of Swiss Manuscripts Brigham Young University-Idaho Special Collections at the David O. McKay Library.
  The Archives of Le Temps Archival collection of every Journal de Genève, Gazette de Lausanne and Nouveau Quotidien.
 The Swiss American Historical Society Records 1927–1985, including correspondence, reports, minutes and other materials, are available for research use at the Historical Society of Pennsylvania.
 The Swiss American Historical Society Review. Articles and reviews featuring Swiss American history and life. 
  Swiss Colonies in Tennessee and Kentucky Collection, 1830–1938 University of Tennessee Special Collections Library, Knoxville, TN.
   Swiss Posters Collection The Swiss Poster Collection at Carnegie Mellon University.
  Swiss Benevolent Society of Chicago Housed at the University of Illinois at Chicago in the Richard J. Daley Library's Special Collections Department.
  Swiss Society of New Orleans records, 1855–2010 Housed at Tulane University as part of the Louisiana Research Collection, at the Howard-Tilton Memorial Library.
  Swiss Singing Society of Chicago Housed at the University of Illinois at Chicago in the Richard J. Daley Library's Special Collections Department.
  Swiss Prints Collection Graphic Arts Collection in the Department of Rare Books and Special Collections at Princeton University Library.
  Holden Rightmyer/American Swiss Company Papers 1933–1946 The Ward M. Canaday Center for Special Collections at The University of Toledo.
  Richard Bird missionary notebook from the Swiss/Austrian mission Housed at the Harold B. Lee Library at Brigham Young University.
  Swiss and German Mission of the Church of Jesus Christ of Latter-day Saints Housed at the Harold B. Lee Library at Brigham Young University.
 Walter Kiener, Papers Housed in the Archives & Special Collections at the University of Nebraska–Lincoln Libraries.
  Bluntschli (Johann Casper) 1808–1881 Collection 1750–1884 Housed at the Special Collections of the Milton S. Eisenhower Library at The Johns Hopkins University.
  Eddie Rickenbacker Papers Housed at Auburn University Special Collections and Archives.
  The Papers of J. Warren White Housed at the Patricia W. and J. Douglas Perry Library, Old Dominion University.
  Herbert Matter Papers Housed in Special Collections Green Library Stanford University.
  The Rièse collection Housed at The Victoria University Library of the University of Toronto.
  Swiss imprints in French Housed in University of Cambridge.
  The John Lyman Ballif Papers Housed at the J. Willard Marriott Library, University of Utah.
  Diplomatic Documents of Switzerland 
   Robert Billigmeier Collection  Hosted by University of California, Santa Barbara.
   Hoehn and Müller families papers, 1828-1980s Housed at Tulane University as part of the Louisiana Research Collection, at the Howard-Tilton Memorial Library.
  German and Swiss Colonization in Morgan County, Tennessee, 1925 Housed at University of Tennessee Libraries, Knoxville, Special Collections.
   Mennonite Historical Collections Very extensive Collection of Swiss and Swiss-American Mennonite information hosted in the Archives and Special Collections Librarian at Musselman Library, Bluffton University.
 Swiss Settlers in SW Illinois—searchable English translations of 19th-century works by Swiss settlers in southwestern Illinois.

American people of Swiss descent
European-American society
American